Maurice Parker may refer to:
 Maurice W. Parker, Sr. (1873–1958), voice coach, marksman, billiard champion, and violin maker
 Maurice W. Parker, Jr. (1908–1985), president of Parker Manufacturing Co.
 Wes Parker (Maurice W. Parker III) (1939- ), first baseman for the Los Angeles Dodgers
 Maurice S. Parker, U.S. diplomat
 Morris Parker, United States national amateur boxing bantamweight champions